Aerodynamic Aerosol Classifier (AAC) is a measurement technique for classifying aerosol particles according to their aerodynamic diameters.

The technique allows online size classification of particles without requiring them to be electrically charged, and advantageously allows selection of particles within a narrow range of aerodynamic diameters.

This removes many of the difficulties associated with multiple charging artifacts, such as may be encountered when classifying particles according to electrical mobility.

The technique is described by Olfert et al.

References

Aerosols
Aerosol measurement